Seo Yi-sook (born 6 December 1966) is a South Korean theatre, television and movie actress. As supporting actress, Seo is known for her supporting role in drama Empress Ki (2013–2014), The Rebel (2017), Hotel del Luna (2019), The World of the Married (2020), and Start-Up (2020); and also feature film The Mayor (2017). 

In 1986, Seo started her career as an actress by joining a local theatre company in Suwon. She won Best New Actor Award at the 1986 Korea Theatre Festival. Followed by winning Acting Award the 6th National Theatre Festival in 1987. Seo joined Michu Theatre Company in 1989, and her debut work as member was Shin Yi Gukgi (1989). A year later Seo debuted as musical actress in Make a Hero (1990).

She won many prestigious awards such as 2003 Gu Hi-seo Theatre Awards Actor of the Year and  Expected Actor, 40th Dong-A Theatre Awards Best Acting Award (2004) and The 30th Lee Hae-rang Theater Award (2020).

Career

Early life 
Seo was born 6 December 1966, in Yeoncheon-gun, Gyeonggi-do, South Korea. She was the eldest of two siblings. Seo's father died of cirrhosis when Seo was in middle school. Seo only younger brother died in an accident in her early 20s. Seo and her mother, couldn't even watch any dramas for fear of shedding tears over sad scenes. Till this day, Seo's mother, who still live in their hometown, never re-marry.

Seo Yi-sook was a badminton player in Yeoncheon Jeongok High School. She gave up her dream as athlete, after she failed in the first round of the national badminton selection. Due to her difficult family circumstances, she gave up college and entered the Yeoncheon Rural Development Administration as a social and physical badminton coach. One day Seo saw play Agnes of God at the Suwon Arts Theater. As a country girl the experience quite a culture shock for her. However that became a turning point in her life. In her nineteen, she decided to become an actress and applied as member of local theater troupe at the Suwon Arts Theater.

Theatre career 
In 1986, Seo started her career as an actress by joining a local theatre company in Suwon, GyeongGi-Do. Recognized by her speaking skill, Seo performed for the theater in several works. She won Best New Actor Award at the 1986 Korea Theatre Festival. In 1987, Seo selected as main role Yeok-hwa in play Pakkoji. The play was produced by Anyang Arts Theatre with Lee Jae-hyeon as producer and Lee Jae-in as director as representative of GyeongGi-Do in the 6th National Theatre Festival, attended by representative troupes from 13 cities and provinces. The festival was held from May 20 to June 1, 1987, at the Daejeon Civic Centre in Chungcheongnam-do. The play Pakkoji won the grand prize (the President's Award). In the individual category, director Lee Jae-in won the directing award and Seo Yi-sook won Acting Award. The grand prize winner "Pakkoji" was invited to the 12th Seoul International Theatre Festival (1988), and was performed at the Arts Centre Grand Theatre on 19–20 August 1988.

In 1989, Seo moved to Seoul and auditioned to be member of Theatre Company Michu. After training for three months, she debuted in play Shin Yi Gukgi (1989). A year later Seo debuted as musical actress in Make a Hero (1990). She went through more than a decade of laying the groundwork, learning and training in traditional performing arts, with many minor roles in Madangnori of Michu.

After working for around a decade, Seo attended School of Korean Music of Chung-Ang University Undergraduate School. Even though majoring in acting, Seo got her Bachelor Degree on Korean Music.

Play Heo Sam-gwan Blood (2003) was a turning point in her acting career. As Heo Ok-ran, Heo Sam-gwan's wife, Seo took on her first lead role after years of joining Michu. For this role, Seo won 'Player of the Year' and 'Expected Actor' at the Hiseo Theatre Awards on December 20, 2003. She also won Best Acting Award in 40th Dong-A Theatre Awards for the same work. The awards ceremony was held on the 21st floor of the Dong-A Media Center in Sejong-ro, Jongno-gu, Seoul on 13 February 2004.

Breaking the troupe barrier 

In 2005, Seo was offered the role Hester Swain, female lead of a play Cat Swamp, produced by Physic Theater Company. It was the first time in 10 years that Seo, a member of Michu, performed on a stage other than Michu work. Directed by Han Tae-sook, play Cat Swamp, is the representative work of the Irish-born star playwright Marina Carr. It was performed from November 01–13, 2005 at Seoul Daehangno Arko Arts Theater (former Arts Center Arts Theater) Grand Theater. 

While doing working as a theatre actress, in 2005, Seo also continued her study in School of Korean Music of the Graduate School of Chung-Ang University. In 2008, Seo Graduated with Master Degree in Korean Music, with Research in Madangnori as her thesis. She was also worked as a part-time professor of acting class in her alma mater. One of her student was trot singer Song Ga-in.

Noises Off is a 1982 play by the English playwright Michael Frayn. A popular work that premiered in the UK in 1982 and has been performed in 32 countries. It is a comedy that has been made into a movie in Hollywood following a Broadway performance as it is rumoured to be 'a play more interesting than a musical'.

In 2008, Seo was cast as role Helen Damson from the play The Gift of the Gorgon by playwright Peter Shaffer. Seo played opposite actor Jung Dong-hwan, who returned to the stage as Edward Damson after he appeared at the 2003 premiere; and Park Yoon-hee who was cast as Philip. This performance was produced by Experimental theater company. Directed by Koo Tae-hwan, the play The Gift of the Gorgon was held at the Namsan Drama Center on November 18 to 23 2008. This project was the most memorable in Seo's career. She received standing ovation from the audience on her last performance. In August 2009 Seo performed encore the play The Gift of the Gorgon at the Arko Arts Theater in Daehangno, Seoul.

Seo has two other work in the same year. In 2009, director Park Geun-hyung of the alley of the theater company suggested to Seo to do Chekhov's The Seagull together. On why she accepted the offer, Seo said, “I was going to take a break, but I was greedy because it was a small theater play I did in a long time and I was very interested in Park Geun-hyung's work style.”

In 2009, Seo joined play The Women of Picasso by Synsi Musical Company as the opening work of the 30th 2009 Seoul Theater Festival at Towol Theater, Seoul Arts Center from April 16 to 26, 2009. Korean premiere was directed by British director Paul Garrington who directed The Women of Picasso at the 2000 Edinburgh Festival. The original was premiered at the National Theater in London in July 2000, based on a play by Brian McAvera. Afterwards, at the 2000 Edinburgh Festival, each woman's story was performed independently in different theaters by different directors and received favorable reviews. In addition, it has been translated into several languages and performed in European countries such as Italy, Spain, Germany, and the Netherlands.

Take Care of Mom is a play reborn as a play through the hands of writer Go Yeon-ok, who is attracting attention for his sharp insight into the human mind, and director Ko Seok-man, who has shown directing skills in dramas for over 30 years, with stage designer Park Dong-woo, lighting director Koh Hee-sun, and music director Kim Cheol-hwan.

Actress Jeong Hye-sun, who is familiar through the drama, takes on the role of 'mother', and theater actor Seo Yi-suk takes on the role of 'eldest daughter'. Actors Shim Yang-hong (husband), Gil Yong-woo (eldest son), Lee Hye-won (second daughter), Baek Baek-hee (grandmother), and Park Woong (Lee Eun-gyu) also appeared.

In 2011, Seo was selected as the 12th winner by the Kim Dong-hoon Theater Awards Steering Committee led by Chairman Yoo Min-Young. Award was given due Seo excellent acting skills in 'Oedipus' and 'Memories of Catfish' in 2011, and her previous works The Seagull, The Tempest, The Gift of the Gorgon, The Women of Picasso, and Yelha Diary.

The Heretics is a work by British author Richard Bean and is introduced for the first time in Korea. Seo, played the role of Diane Cassel, a scientist and professor of high climate department, the main character.

Debut in television 
Seo first television appearance was in early 2010 when she took on the role of Queen Myeong-seong in the SBS drama Jejungwon. Empress of the Joseon Dynasty, real name Min Ja-young. She was close with Allen, who saved the life of her niece Min Young-ik, and later became close with Horton. In early 2011, Seo took on the role of the beggar's wife in MBC historical drama The Duo. Since then the broadcasting industry began to pay attention to Seo, and offer poured in.

Seo decided to focus on television projects, due to health reason. The newly launched general programming channel JTBC proposed the role of Park Sang-gung (Court Lady Park). In the weekend historical drama Insu, the Queen Mother (2011). It was followed by MBC weekend drama Feast of the Gods (2012). In this drama, she is appearing as Noh Young-shim, Arirang's assistant chef, responsible for Chanmo (kimchi, basic side dish). She has a crush on the chef Lim Do-sik (Park Sang-myeon) of Arirang. Drama plot depicted battle between Go Jun-young (Sung Yu-ri) and Ha In-joo (Seo Hyun-jin) for the position of a master chef in Arirang, a traditional Korean restaurant which is considered the best of Korean cuisine.

Theatre comeback 
In 2012, Seo finally in a good condition to return to theater. Her first stage was play I Miss Your Parents, adapted from Japanese theatrical play Oya no Kao ga Mitai by Seigo Hatasawa, a Japanese playwright who dealt with the issue of school violence. Korean adaptation was directed by Kim Gwang-bo, who has directed works with strong social messages, and a large number of theater stars such as Son Sook, Park Yong-su, Lee Dae-yeon, Park Ji-il, Gil Hae-yeon, Jang Young-nam, and Seo Eun-kyung also appeared. Seo, double cast with Gil Hae-yeon, played the role of a mother who presses the victim's student's family by using the courage to be the head of the school administration.

Seo has been meeting with the audience since the 9th through Romeo and Juliet, a play commemorating the 400th anniversary of Shakespeare's death. Park Jung-Min and Moon Geun-Young, who are the most talented couples in Chungmuro, took on the roles of 'Romeo' and 'Juliet' respectively, and she is responsible for the weight of the entire work with Son Byung-ho (the bride), who disassembled as the nanny of 'Juliet'.

Memorable screen roles 
In 2013, Seo appeared as "Seo Sang-gung" on historical television series Empress Ki. "Seo Sang-gung" or Court Lady Seo was Empress Tanashiri's right-hand servant. (Baek Jin-hee). Her next role in the following year was as a chief of the Gangnam Police Station, Kang Seok-soon in 2014 SBS drama You're All Surrounded, written by Lee Jeong-sun and directed by Yoo In-sik.

In 2017, Seo joined cast of detective drama Bad Thief, Good Thief as Hong Mi-ae. In the same year, Seo back to historical drama as Jo Cham-bong's wife, Lady Jo, in The Rebel. At first, the role was minor, Seo was supposed to appear only in episodes 1 to 5. However the director loved her acting and her screen times  expanded, Lady Jo appeared until final episode (episode 30). Thanks to her performance, the 2017 MBC Drama Awards on December 30, 2017, Seo won the Golden Acting Award in the Monday-Tuesday Drama category.

In 2017, she joined film Special Citizen as the wife of lead character mayor of Seoul Byun Jong-goo (played by Choi Min-shik). Choi picked his scene with Seo as the most memorable scene. The scene shows Byeon Jong-goo selling his daughter's name to cover up his crime, and Byeon Jong-goo's wife, knowing this, criticizes him. As the conflict between the characters reached its peak, emotional acting was a more important scene. Choi Min-sik advised Seo to vent her wife's resentment, he said "When I said, 'I'll hit you like a bell in a chapel,' I thought I was really going to die. I got hit once with a full swing, and if I took it twice, my face would change." The filming was finished, and the cut was included in the main story as it is,”

In 2018, Seo starred in KBS musical drama Beautiful Story of Joseon. Directed by Kim Dae-hyun, this musical drama depicts the story of young people who wanted find their dreams against the backdrop of the first beauty contest in the Joseon Dynasty. In this two episodes drama, written by Kyung Min-seon, Seo acted alongside Pentagon Yeo-won, Kim Na-ni, Bae Yoon-kyung, and Jung Eun-Pyo. Her next role was Madam Ra in drama Mother. Followed by Kwon Young-sil in My Secret Terrius.

In 2019, she starred in Hong Sisters's drama series Hotel del Luna, a fantasy drama, playing six different characters, six sisters Gods Ma-go. She acted opposite Lee Ji-eun and Yeo Jin-goo. Directed by Oh Choong-hwan and Kim Jung-hyun, it was the most viewed tvN drama of 2019, and is currently the sixteenth highest-rated Korean drama in cable television history.

In 2020, Seo starred as the wife of Chairman Choi, a patient of title role Ji Seon-wooas (Kim Hee-ae), who is a realistic person who has a lot of influence on Ji in The World of the Married. Adapted from BBC Doctor Foster, this drama became highest-rated drama in Korean cable television history. In the same year, Seo reunited with director Oh Choong-hwan in drama Start-Up. Seo plays Yoon Seon-hak, the CEO of SH Venture Capital and the founder of Sandbox. She had a pioneering vision of recognizing the business and she succeeded both as an investor in her business and as an investor. Also in 2020, Seo was cast Jo Yoon-sil, the strict mother of Seon Woo-jun, acted by Lee Jae-wook in KBS drama Do Do Sol Sol La La Sol.

Recent theatre works 

Electra, one of the representative Greek tragedies, was chosen by director Han Tae-sook. this Electra, writer Ko Yeon-ok, who is called “the alchemist of a crime drama,” will take on the adaptation, and it will be a tense variation on Electra's revenge play, who has turned into a guerrilla warrior with a bunker in the background. In addition, the roles of Electra and Clytemnestra, who are in charge of the two axes of conflict in the work, will be played by Seo Yi-sook and Jang Young-nam, who are returning to the theatrical stage after a long time, and will show charismatic performances. They will add depth and anticipation to the work.

In 2019, Seo starred in a monologue play called 'Lady Macbeth's Wardrobe', was held on November 6 and 7 at Donhwamun Traditional Music Hall in Seoul. Based on the original Shakespeare play 'Macbeth', it is a reinterpretation of the story of Korean Lady Macbeth. Through 'Hanbok' in her closet, her memories of the past are summoned to the present.

Also in 2019, Seo and Woo Mi-hwa were double cast as Nora; and Son Jong-hak and Park Ho-san were double cast as Torwald in Korean adaptation of play A Doll's House Part 2 by American playwright Lucas Hnath. The original play was released in 2017, written as the “sequel” of Henrik Ibsen's masterpiece A Doll's House, premiered in December 1879, is a story about Nora Helmer – wife of Torvald, mother of three, is living out the ideal of the 19th-century wife, but leaves her family at the end of the play. In A Doll's House Part 2, set in 1894, Nora Helmer, who already became successful writer, back after 15 years to file for her divorce.

The Shepherd Instead is a psychological drama of sympathy and remorse for throwing away things that we should not throw away.  Directed, written by Han Tae-sook. It was held from March 6 (Fri) to March 15 (Sun), 2020 at Arko Arts Theater Small Theater, Seoul. Seo starred with Jeon Park-chan, Son Jin-hwan, Kim Eun-seok, Seong Yeo-jin, Kim Do-wan, Yoo Seung-rak, Park Soo-jin.

Seo won the 30th Lee Hae-rang Drama Award at the awards ceremony held at the Chosun Ilbo Museum of Art on the 22nd of June 2020.

In 2021, Seo starred in the MPN Company play Vincent River, adaption of Philip Ridley's play, directed by Shin Yoo-cheong. Woo was offered the role Anita in March 2021, a mother who lost her gay son Vincent overnight in a homophobic assault and murder case. The storyline is focused on conversation between Anita and Davy, who hovers around Anita. This play discuss issues of homophobia, crimes caused by that hate, and discriminatory views. The play was the second project of Ateod and Mpn Company collaboration to revitalize the Daehangno performance market and create a stable production environment. It was performed for the first time in Korea in April 2021.  

The Dressing Room (Gakuya) is a play that takes place in the dressing room of the theater where Anton Chekhov's The Seagull is performing. The four actress unravel the story of longing for the role and regrets about life. Actors Seo Yi-sook and Jung Jae-eun, were double-cast for actress 'A' (a ghost) who sits down in the dressing room after she has never been able to play the role she wanted for the rest of her life. 'A' mainly plays a prompter or takes on a male minor role, and had dream todo female role. The play is the representative work of Kunio Shimizu, a famous Japanese playwright who passed away in April of this year.

Philanthropy 
Seo, who was honored with the 30th Hae-rang Theater Award, donated the prize money to his alma mater and colleagues in the performing arts industry who are going through a difficult time due to COVID-19. On the 25th, Seo Yi-sook's agency, Quantum E&M, announced, "Actress Yi-sook Seo donated the theater prize money to the theater industry, including the Welfare Foundation, a theater, and Jeongok High School, where she graduated."

Seo signed an agreement with three senior centers, including Jeongok Senior Citizens Center, Jeongok 5-ri Senior Citizens’ Center, and Jeongok Koaru Apartment Senior Citizens’ Center, and sponsored them on July 1, 2022.

Personal life 
In 2011, Seo did a comprehensive health checkup for the first time in her life. The health checkup was prepared by the Korea Actors Welfare Foundation for actors who do not receive the four major insurance benefits. She was diagnosed with thyroid cancer. in July 2011, she underwent surgery after finishing play performance of Memories of Catfish. The operation went well, but the problem was that the thyroid gland is just below the uvula, her vocal cords was wounded during the operation with could result in vocal cord abnormality. For a theater actor whose vocalization is life, it was a fatal wound. Seo had to dropped her six upcoming theater projects because of this. Seo decided to accept television roles while recovering.

In July and September of 2021, false rumors spread that Seo Yi-sook had died from heart attack. Later it was founded that the rumour was spread by netizen A. Her agency Quantum E&M sued the perpretator. Her agency Quantum E&M made a statement saying, "There is no leniency."

Filmography

Film

Television 

.

Web series

Television show

Stage

Musical

Theater

Voice actor

Audiobook

Radio

Discography

Ambassadorship

Awards and nominations

Notes

References

External links 
 
 
  
 Seo Yi-Sook at Daum Encyclopedia 
 Seo Yi-Sook at Daum Movie 
 Seo Yi-Sook at PlayDB 

Living people
1966 births
South Korean television actresses
South Korean film actresses
Chung-Ang University alumni